North Broad station, known as North Broad Street until 1992, is a SEPTA Regional Rail station in Philadelphia, Pennsylvania. It is located at 2601 North Broad Street (PA 611) in the Cecil B. Moore section of Lower North Philadelphia, and serves the Lansdale/Doylestown Line and the Manayunk/Norristown Line. The station has low-level platforms on the outside tracks, with "mini-high" platforms for wheelchair and ADA accessibility.

North Broad station is within a few blocks of the North Philadelphia SEPTA-Amtrak station (formerly belonging to the Pennsylvania Railroad), which serves Amtrak's Keystone Service and Northeast Regional and SEPTA's Trenton Line and Chestnut Hill West Line, and the North Philadelphia subway station on SEPTA's Broad Street Line. The station is in the Center City fare zone, although the station itself is located in North Philadelphia.

History

Huntingdon Street station 

The Pennsylvania Railroad (PRR) built the Connecting Railway in 1867 to connect its main line to the Philadelphia and Trenton Railroad. By the early 1870s, New York Junction station was established where the Connecting Railway crossed over the Philadelphia and Reading Railroad mainline in North Philadelphia. By the early 1880s, the Reading established 16th Street station a block to the northwest.

In 1888, the Reading announced plans to add local stations on the line, including one next to the Baker Bowl, which had opened as the home of the Philadelphia Phillies in 1887. By 1891, the company offered service to Huntingdon Street station as well as 16th Street. The station had two side platforms serving the line's four tracks, with a small station building facing Broad Street and Huntingdon Street. 16th Street station was closed in the early 20th century.

North Broad Street station 

In 1928, facing competition from the impending completion of the Broad Street Line, the Reading decided to replace Huntingdon Street station with a larger station to rival the PRR's nearby North Philadelphia station. Groundbreaking for Broad Street station was held on July 31, 1928 and demolition of Huntingdon Street station began immediately. The classical revival station, designed by Horace Trumbauer, opened as North Broad Street in 1929. The station featured two island platforms which served all four tracks, connected by an underground walkway to the station, street, and the Broad Street Line's North Philadelphia station. Its grand design reflected pre-Great Depression optimism and plans for redevelopment of the surrounding neighborhood.

However, the Great Depression took away passengers and prevented the planned development, and the collapse of local industry after World War II further damaged the neighborhood. Ridership at the station dwindled as passengers opted for private cars or the more frequent subway. The station building was closed and sold for use as a motel in the 1960s; passengers continued to access the platforms through the pedestrian tunnel. In 1981, the station was heavily damaged by fire.

Railworks 

On April 5, 1992, SEPTA began their 18-month-long RailWorks project, which included two multi-month shutdowns of the Reading mainline from Wayne Junction to Market East for emergency bridge repairs. As part of the project, North Broad Street and Temple University stations were completely rebuilt. Within two weeks of the closure, demolition of the old platforms was under way. The rebuilt station has two side platforms serving only the outer tracks, which were chosen to straighten the curved tracks around the former island platforms and thus allow higher speeds through the station for express trains. The pedestrian tunnel was closed and filled; access to the platforms is via ramps from North Broad Street. The station, renamed as North Broad, reopened at the end of Railworks on September 5, 1993.

Before RailWorks, North Broad Street served 1,200 riders per day, many of whom were transferring to the Broad Street Line or changing for one of the few trains that stopped at Temple. With the addition of Regional Rail platforms at Fern Rock Transportation Center for RailWorks, substantially more service to Temple through the Center City tunnel after the conclusion of the project, and sharply reduced service due to only having two platform tracks rather than the previous four, the importance of North Broad declined significantly after RailWorks. By 2001, under 300 riders used the station daily.

Station building reuse 
In March 1996, the station building was added to the National Register of Historic Places. That September, Volunteers of America began a $8.3 million renovation to convert the structure into 108 housing units for people transitioning out of homeless shelters. The organization previously had used part of the first floor for adult rehabilitation and counseling programs, but the structure was so deteriorated that only 18% of the floor space was usable. The first residents moved into Station House Apartments in August 1997.

Station layout

References

External links 

SEPTA – North Broad Station
 Broad Street entrance from Google Maps Street View

SEPTA Regional Rail stations
Railway stations on the National Register of Historic Places in Philadelphia
Former Reading Company stations
Railway stations in the United States opened in 1929
Templetown, Philadelphia
Stations on the SEPTA Main Line
Horace Trumbauer buildings